Askul Darreh (also Romanized as Āsḵūl Darreh) is a village in Chendar Rural District, Chendar District, Savojbolagh County, Alborz Province, Iran. In the 2006 census, its population was 17, in 7 families.

References 

Populated places in Savojbolagh County